Temagami Water Aerodrome  is located  southwest of Temagami, Ontario, Canada.

See also
 Temagami/Mine Landing Water Aerodrome

References

Registered aerodromes in Ontario
Transport in Temagami
Strathy Township
Seaplane bases in Ontario
Airports in Nipissing District